American Idol Season 11 Highlights may refer to:

 American Idol Season 11 Highlights (Hollie Cavanagh EP), 2012
 American Idol Season 11 Highlights (Jessica Sanchez EP), 2012
 American Idol Season 11 Highlights (Joshua Ledet EP), 2012
 American Idol Season 11 Highlights (Phillip Phillips EP), 2012
 American Idol Season 11 Highlights (Skylar Laine EP), 2012